Gerrit Bouwmeester ( – ) was a Dutch footballer. He was part of the Netherlands national football team, playing 1 match on 28 April 1912.

See also
 List of Dutch international footballers

References

External links
 Gerrit Bouwmeester at voetballegends.nl

1892 births
1961 deaths
Footballers from Haarlem
Association football midfielders
Dutch footballers
Netherlands international footballers
HFC Haarlem players